Gusinaya may refer to:

Gusinaya Zemlya, a peninsula in Arkhangelsk Oblast
Gusinaya Bay, a bay in Yakutia
Gusinaya (river), a river flowing into Gusinaya Bay
Gusinaya Lyaga, a settlement in Altai Krai